Sweetwater City Schools is the school district of Sweetwater, Tennessee. It operates elementary through junior high school levels and includes the Monroe County section of Sweetwater and several unincorporated areas. Monroe County Schools serves the high school grade levels.

Terrie Dalton, a guidance counselor, facilitated efforts to create the websites of each of the schools in the district.

The U.S. Census Bureau indicates the school district is entirely in Monroe County, and that the small McMinn County portion of the city is in McMinn County Schools.

Schools
 Sweetwater Primary School 
 Sweetwater Elementary School
 Brown Intermediate School
 Sweetwater Junior High School  (SJHS)

Students continue to Sweetwater High School, operated by Monroe County Schools.

References

Further reading
 "LEA COMPREHENSIVE APPLICATION FOR SPECIAL EDUCATION SERVICES: Sweetwater City Schools." State of Tennessee. (Archive)
"Sweetwater City Schools Administrative Office Building." (Archive) At Nashville Contractors Association.

External links

 Sweetwater City Schools
 

School districts in Tennessee
Education in Monroe County, Tennessee